Verzegnis (Carnian ) is a comune (municipality) in the Province of Udine in the Italian region Friuli-Venezia Giulia, located about  northwest of Trieste and about  northwest of Udine.

The town of Verzegnis hosts the annual Hillclimb Rally. This is an FIA-sanctioned event, which brings in many spectators and drivers from around the world.

Verzegnis borders the following municipalities: Cavazzo Carnico, Enemonzo, Preone, Tolmezzo, Tramonti di Sotto, Villa Santina, Vito d'Asio.

References

Cities and towns in Friuli-Venezia Giulia